The 1974 Lehigh Engineers football team was an American football team that represented Lehigh University as an independent during the 1974 NCAA Division II football season.

In their tenth year under head coach Fred Dunlap, the Engineers compiled a 7–3 record. Jim Addonizio and Joe Alleva were the team captains.

After starting the season with two wins, the Engineers briefly appeared in the national NCAA small-college coaches poll, ranking No. 15 for the last full week of September. A loss that weekend to Division I opponent Penn dropped them out of the top 20. Lehigh remained unranked the rest of the year.

Lehigh played its home games at Taylor Stadium on the university campus in Bethlehem, Pennsylvania.

Schedule

References

Lehigh
Lehigh Mountain Hawks football seasons
Lehigh Engineers football